Saint-Cyrille-de-Lessard is a parish municipality in Quebec, Canada.

Demographics 

See also
 List of municipalities in Quebec

References

External links
 

Parish municipalities in Quebec
Incorporated places in Chaudière-Appalaches